The ZEC of Rimouski River is a "zone d'exploitation contrôlée" (controlled harvesting zone) (zec), in the administrative region of Bas-Saint-Laurent, in Quebec, in Canada. It is administered by the "Association des pêcheurs sportifs de saumon de la rivière Rimouski".

Geography 
It is located in the territory of the city of Rimouski, the municipalities of Saint-Valérien and Saint-Narcisse-de-Rimouski.

Its territory is adjacent to the Duchénier Wildlife Reserve.

Attachment

Related articles
 Bas-Saint-Laurent, administrative region of Quebec
 Rimouski
 Saint-Valérien
 Saint-Narcisse-de-Rimouski
 Zone d'exploitation contrôlée (controlled harvesting zone) (zec)

Notes et references

External links 
 Association des pêcheurs sportifs de saumon de la rivière Rimouski (Association of salmon anglers the Rimouski River)

Protected areas established in 1993
Protected areas of Bas-Saint-Laurent